The 2003 Melbourne Storm season was the 6th in the club's history. They competed in the NRL's 2003 Telstra Premiership and finished the regular season 5th  out of 15 teams, before reaching the semi-final where they were knocked out by Canterbury-Bankstown Bulldogs. It was Craig Bellamy's first season as head coach of the club.

Under new coach Craig Bellamy, the 2003 season for the Storm was one of regaining premiership credibility. Melbourne reached the finals for the first time since 2000 with evergreen Robbie Kearns and a confident Matt Orford showing the way.

A disappointing exit two weeks before the Grand Final was tempered by the rise of young Queenslanders Billy Slater and Cameron Smith. Unheard of at the start of 2003, the steady hooker and dummy-half Smith gave splendid service to Orford and his forwards. He was rewarded with a place in the Maroons Origin side and was unlucky to miss the Kangaroos train-on squad.

The silky and pacy moves of Slater in the centres and at fullback were attention getters for fans and keen judges of football talent alike. His debut season for the Storm realised a record 19 tries and talk of a big future in the game.

Season Summary
 Pre season – Melbourne are one of four clubs fined for salary cap breaches during the 2002 NRL season. Melbourne's fine is $66,698 relating to previous contracts.
 World Sevens – Storm participate in the return of Rugby League World Sevens, losing all three of their pool matches at Aussie Stadium.
 14 February – Stephen Kearney is appointed as Melbourne captain.
 20 February – Reports emerge former trackwork jockey Billy Slater has secured a spot in Melbourne's squad ahead of the 2003 season.
 27 February – Willie Leyshon announces his retirement from rugby league after a succession of serious knee injuries.
 5 March – A number of Sydney NRL clubs voice their opposition to the NRL's decision to grant salary cap concessions to Melbourne to help support relocated players.
 12 March – NRL CEO David Gallop throws his support behind the proposal to allow Melbourne salary cap concessions to cover relocation expenses for players.
 Round 1 – Recovering from a 22-0 deficit, Melbourne stage an amazing comeback victory 36-32 over Cronulla-Sutherland Sharks at Toyota Park. On his NRL debut, Billy Slater scores a stunning try to spark the comeback, with Steven Bell scoring a hat-trick.
 18 March – Melbourne Executive Director John Ribot withdraws Melbourne's application for salary cap concessions for players living away from home, saying "Melbourne don't want to be the source of division among the other clubs." Parramatta Eels boss Denis Fitzgerald and Penrith Panthers boss Shane Richardson had been outspoken in the days since the proposal was first mooted, with Canberra Raiders also requesting salary cap concessions.
 Round 2 –  forward Rodney Howe suffers a serious knee injury as an understrength Melbourne thrash Penrith 42-16. Head coach Craig Bellamy praises rookie Billy Slater who scored two tries in the win, saying "he's got something special about him. I wasn't quite sure when he was going to actually show it, but he's showed it pretty early. He's a special talent."
 23 April – Aaron Moule announces his retirement from rugby league due to niggling injury problems.
 Round 7 – In his Storm debut, Andrew McFadden is injured again, succumbing to a groin injury in the first half. McFadden's injuries keep him out of the line-up for the rest of the season.
 Round 8 – Returning after a two-week injury break, Matt Orford scores 16 points in Melbourne's dominate 46-6 victory over a depleted Newcastle Knights. 
 9 May – Robbie Ross undergoes surgery on a bulging disc injury, after playing five of the opening eight games of the season.
 Round 9 – Melbourne inflict Canberra Raiders' first defeat of the season 30-10, despite an injury in the warm-up to Junior Langi.
 Round 10 – In the last game of rugby league at Brisbane's ANZ Stadium, an injury to Matt Orford cruels Melbourne's quest for a first win over the Broncos since 2001.
 6 June – Matt Geyer signs a two-year contract extension, to keep him in Melbourne until the end of the 2005 NRL season.
 7 June – Scott Hill re-signs with Melbourne, inking a new five-year contract.
 Round 13 – South Sydney Rabbitohs beat Melbourne for the first time, with the league cellar-dwellers stunning Melbourne 41-14.
 Round 14 – Ending a two-game winless streak, Melbourne defeat Penrith 32-12 to end the Panthers' eight-game winning streak.
 Round 15 –  Scott Hill suffers a shoulder injury in Melbourne's loss to Canterbury-Bankstown Bulldogs. Hill had feared his season was over, but subsequent scans cleared him of a serious injury.
 Round 17 – 0-4 at the venue, Melbourne upset Canberra 18-8 to win their first game ever at Bruce Stadium.
 9 July – Melbourne sign promising  Steve Turner to a three-year contract from 2004.
 11 July – John Ribot is forced to deny rumours the club would merge with Collingwood saying, "I don't think you'll see us merging. I've got more chance of flying to the moon."
 19 July – Robbie Kearns signs on with Melbourne for a further two seasons.
 Round 19 – Brisbane Broncos pip Melbourne 26-22 in the club's first ever golden point game, after scores were tied 22-all after 80 minutes. Broncos winger Scott Minto scores the winning try three minutes into extra time.
 27 July – Fan-favourite Marcus Bai announces he will be leaving Melbourne at the end of the season, taking up a two-year contact with Leeds Rhinos.
 Round 21 – Melbourne reclaim the Michael Moore Trophy, winning 14-12 over New Zealand Warriors with a 41-metre penalty goal from Matt Orford the difference.
 Round 23 – After his first game back from injury since June, Scott Hill is ruled out for the rest of the season after re-injuring his troublesome shoulder.
 4 September – In a dispute with the RLPA, the NRL cancel the annual Dally M Awards. Both Billy Slater and Cameron Smith were favourites for the Rookie of the Year Award.
 Round 26 – In a rousing farewell, Marcus Bai scores and converts a try in his farewell appearance at Olympic Park. Melbourne thrash Manly Warringah Sea Eagles 40-10 to finish the season in fifth place, securing the club's first finals appearance since the 2000 NRL season.
 Qualifying Final – In a controversial 30-18 upset win over Canberra, referee Tim Mander cracks down on Melbourne players employing so-called 'grapple tackles' to slow down the play-the-ball. Coach Craig Bellamy accuses Canberra of making complaints to the NRL about the tackling style, claims rejected by both the NRL and Canberra coach Matt Elliott. The controversy overshadows Melbourne's first finals win since the 1999 NRL Grand Final, causing much media talk in the days after the game between Melbourne officials, referee's boss Robert Finch and league pundits.
 Semi Final – Melbourne are eliminated from the finals in a whitewash by Canterbury-Bankstown Bulldogs, held scoreless in a 30-0 defeat. It is the first time in 158 NRL games that Melbourne had failed to score.

Milestone games

Jerseys

Melbourne signed up a new apparel partner for the 2003 season, with Canterbury of New Zealand the new manufacturer of club jerseys. The home jersey design was unchanged from the 2001-02 jersey, but for a white collar replacing the gold. The club's clash colours was changed to a mostly white design with a purple chevron and gold thunderbolts, worn with navy shorts.

Fixtures

Pre Season

Regular season
Source:
(GP) - Golden Point extra time
(pen) - Penalty try

Finals

Ladder

2003 Coaching Staff
Head coach: Craig Bellamy
Assistant coach: Dean Lance
Football manager: Greg Brentnall
Physical Preparation Coach: Alex Corvo
Physiotherapist: Matt Natusch
Head trainer: Troy Thompson

2003 squad
List current as of 6 September 2021

Player movements

Losses
 William Leyshon to Parramatta Eels
 Keith Mason to St Helens (mid season)
 Henry Perenara to St George Illawarra Dragons
 Ian Sibbit to Warrington Wolves
 Richard Swain to Brisbane Broncos
 Shane Walker to Retirement

Gains
 Nathan Friend from Brisbane Broncos
 David Kidwell from Sydney Roosters
 Andrew McFadden from Parramatta Eels
 Nathan Sologinkin from Canterbury-Bankstown Bulldogs
 Robert Tanielu from Brisbane Broncos

Representative honours
This table lists all players who have played a representative match in 2003.

Statistics
This table contains playing statistics for all Melbourne Storm players to have played in the 2003 NRL season. 

Statistics sources:

Scorers

Most points in a game: 16 points
 Round 8 - Matt Orford (1 try, 6 goals) vs Newcastle Knights
 Round 14 - Matt Orford (1 try, 6 goals) vs Penrith Panthers
 Round 23 - Matt Orford (1 try, 6 goals) vs Parramatta Eels

Most tries in a game: 3 
 Round 1 - Steven Bell vs Cronulla-Sutherland Sharks
 Round 23 - Billy Slater vs Parramatta Eels

Winning games

Highest score in a winning game: 50 points 
 Round 23 vs Parramatta Eels

Lowest score in a winning game: 12 points
 Round 11 vs Parramatta Eels

Greatest winning margin: 40 points 
 Round 8 vs Newcastle Knights

Greatest number of games won consecutively: 4
 Round 23 - Qualifying Final

Losing games

Highest score in a losing game: 28 points
 Round 4 vs Newcastle Knights

Lowest score in a losing game: 0 points 
 Semi Final vs Canterbury-Bankstown Bulldogs

Greatest losing margin: 46 points
 Round 22 vs Canterbury-Bankstown Bulldogs

Greatest number of games lost consecutively: 2 
 Round 6 - Round 7
 Round 12 - Round 13

Feeder Team
Melbourne Storm reserve players again travelled to Brisbane each week to play with Queensland Cup team Norths Devils. Coached by Gary Greinke, Norths missed the finals for the first time under the affiliation with Melbourne, with Cooper Cronk winning club's player of the year award.

Awards and honours

Melbourne Storm Awards Night
Melbourne Storm Player of the Year: Robbie Kearns 
Melbourne Storm Rookie of the Year: Cameron Smith  
Melbourne Storm Clubman of the Year: Marcus Bai  
Mick Moore Chairman's Award: Danny Williams

Notes

References

Melbourne Storm seasons
Melbourne Storm season